Rozalin Penchev (born 11 December 1994) is a Bulgarian volleyball player, a member of Brazilian club Sesc RJ.

Personal life
Penchev was born in Plovdiv. He has two older brothers, Chavdar (born 1987), Nikolay (born 1992) and identical twin brother Chono, all of them are professional volleyball players.

Career
In 2014 he started his professional career in Polish club Effector Kielce, but it was a weak season for the team and Effector took 12th place in PlusLiga. With Bulgaria national team he achieved silver medal in 2015 European Games. Then he moved to Turkish team, where he has played one season and the team took 10th place in the league. In 2016 he was loaned by PGE Skra Bełchatów to Italian club Top Volley Latina. In 2017 he moved to Personal Bolívar, in the Liga Argentina de Voleibol.

Sporting achievements

National team
 2015  European Games

References

External links
FIVB Profile

1994 births
Living people
Sportspeople from Plovdiv
Bulgarian men's volleyball players
Expatriate volleyball players in Poland
Effector Kielce players
Expatriate volleyball players in Turkey
Volleyball players at the 2015 European Games
European Games medalists in volleyball
European Games silver medalists for Bulgaria
Expatriate volleyball players in Italy
Bulgarian expatriates in Italy
Bulgarian expatriate sportspeople in Poland
Bulgarian expatriate sportspeople in Turkey